Henry Holland, 3rd Duke of Exeter, 3rd Earl of Huntington (27 June 1430 – September 1475) was a Lancastrian leader during the English Wars of the Roses. He was the only son of John Holland, 2nd Duke of Exeter, and his first wife, Anne Stafford. His maternal grandparents were Edmund Stafford, 5th Earl of Stafford, and Anne of Gloucester.

Career
He inherited the Dukedom of Exeter and Earl of Huntington when his father died in 1447. However, he was cruel, savagely temperamental and unpredictable, and so had little support. P.M. Kendall describes him as "dangerous", and was seen as "cruel and fierce" by contemporary Italian observers.

Constable of the Tower
Exeter was for a time Constable of the Tower of London, and afterwards the rack there came to be called "the Duke of Exeter's daughter".

Wars of the Roses
In 1447 he married Anne, the eight-year-old daughter of Richard of York. However, in the Wars of the Roses, he remained loyal to Henry VI against the Yorkists. He was imprisoned at Wallingford Castle when York briefly seized power after the First Battle of St Albans in 1455. In 1458 he participated in The Love Day, an attempt at reconciliation between the rival factions. He was a commander at the Lancastrian victories at the Battle of Wakefield in 1460 and the Second Battle of St Albans in 1461, and in the decisive defeat at Towton in 1461. He fled to Scotland after the battle, and then joined Queen Margaret in her exile in France. He was attainted in 1461, and his estates were given to his wife, who separated from him in 1464. During the brief period of Henry VI's restoration he was able to regain many of his estates and posts.

At the Battle of Barnet, Exeter commanded the Lancastrian left flank. He was badly wounded and left for dead, but survived. Afterwards he was imprisoned, and Anne divorced him in 1472. He "volunteered" to serve on Edward IV's 1475 expedition to France. On the return voyage he fell overboard and drowned, his body being found in the sea between Dover and Calais, Fabyan saying "but how he drowned, the certainty is not known". However, Giovanni Panicharolla, the Milanese envoy to the Burgundian court, was told by Duke Charles that the King of England had given specific orders for the sailors to throw his former brother-in-law overboard.

Family
Before 30 July 1447, he married Anne of York, the eldest child of Richard, Duke of York, and Cecily Neville. She was an older sister of Edward IV and Richard III.

He had one legitimate child:
Anne Holland (1461 – between 26 August 1467 and 6 June 1474), who married Thomas Grey, 1st Marquess of Dorset.

Since Henry had no legitimate male issue the disposition of his estates became a complex matter for his widow, the dowager Duchess of Exeter.

See also
List of people who disappeared mysteriously at sea
List of unsolved deaths

Ancestry

References

External links
 
 
 

1430 births
1475 deaths
15th-century English Navy personnel
103
Earls of Huntingdon
Formerly missing people
Heirs to the English throne
Henry
Henry
Lord High Admirals of England
Military personnel from Devon
Military personnel from Exeter
People lost at sea
People of the Wars of the Roses
Unsolved deaths in the United Kingdom